Riethnordhausen is a village and a former municipality in the Mansfeld-Südharz district, Saxony-Anhalt, Germany. Since 1 July 2009, it is part of the municipality Wallhausen.

Geography 
Riethnordhausen is situated in the Rieth in the lower Helme valley, north-east of the Kyffhäuser and south-west of Sangerhausen, the capital of the Mansfeld-Südharz, from which the connecting road leads to the place, which crosses here with the road between Kelbra and Artern.

Former municipalities in Saxony-Anhalt
Mansfeld-Südharz